Dick Howard may refer to:

 A.E. Dick Howard (born 1933), American legal scholar
 Dick Howard (hurdler) (1935–1967), American hurdler
 Dick Howard (soccer) (born 1943), British-Canadian soccer player and coach

See also 
 Richard Howard (disambiguation)